The 1920-21 season in Swedish football, starting January 1920 and ending July 1921:

Honours

Official titles

Competitions

Promotions, relegations and qualifications

Promotions

League transfers

Relegations

Domestic results

Division 1 Svenska Serien 1920–21

Division 2 Uppsvenska Serien 1920–21

Division 2 Mellansvenska Serien 1920–21

Division 2 Västsvenska Serien 1920–21

Division 2 Sydsvenska Serien 1920–21

Svenska Mästerskapet 1920 
Final

Kamratmästerskapen 1920 
Final

Wicanderska Välgörenhetsskölden 1920 
Final

National team results 

 Sweden: 

 Sweden: 

 Sweden: 

 Sweden: 

 Sweden: 

 Sweden: 

 Sweden: 

 Sweden: 

 Sweden: 

 Sweden: 

 Sweden: 

 Sweden: 

 Sweden: 

 Sweden:

National team players in season 1920/21

Notes

References 
Print

Online

 
Seasons in Swedish football